Paul Gare or Kei Biu-Law (born May 8, 1952 in Salt Lake City, Utah) is an American born Hong Kong television actor. Apart from English, Gare can speak Cantonese.

A graduate of RMIT University Gare began his acting career in 1980 playing mostly as an extra and namely as a foreigner. He was contracted with TVB (1982-1999, 2008–present), then with Asia TV (1983-2000). Gare represents the traditional non-Chinese actor in Hong Kong whereas more recent actors have had more prominent roles.

Filmography

TVB

Most of his acting appearances have been with TVB

Love and Passion (萬水千山總是情) 1982 - as French consular official
Looking Back in Anger (義不容情) 1989 - as Mr Brown
The Greed of Man (大時代) 1992
A Kindred Spirit (真情) 1995-1999
Off Pedder 2008
The Threshold of a Persona (ID精英) 2008 - as police officer 
Rosy Business (巾幗梟雄) 2009 - as doctor
Burning Flame III (烈火雄心III) 2009 - as security guard
A Watchdog's Tale (老友狗狗) 2009 (Episode 19)
Off Pedder (畢打自己人) 2010 Mr. Johnson
No Regrets (巾幗梟雄之義海豪情) 2010 - as doctor
Bottled Passion (我的如意狼君) 2011 (Episode 7)
Wish and Switch (換樂無窮) 2012
L'Escargot (缺宅男女) 2012
Queens of Diamonds and Hearts (東西宮略) 2012 - as doctor
Master of Play (心戰) 2012 - as Johnson
Ghetto Justice II (怒火街頭2) 2012 - as judge
Highs and Lows (雷霆掃毒) 2012 - as doctor
Silver Spoon, Sterling Shackles (名媛望族) 2012
Bullet Brain (神探高倫布) 2013
ICAC Investigators 2014 (廉政行动) 2014 as Mr. Lawrence
Lord Of Shanghai (梟雄) 2015 - as judge
ICAC Investigators 2016 (廉政行动 2016) 2016 - as David Morgan's lawyer
Law dis-Order (律政强人) 2016 - as Dicky
Come Home Love: Dinner At 8 (愛·回家之八時入席) 2016 - as senior official
Bet Her (賭城群英會) 2017
Legal Mavericks (踩過界) 2017 - as lawyer
The Unholy Alliance (同盟) 2017
My Ages Apart (誇世代) 2017 - as Father
Daddy Cool (逆緣) 2018 - as judge
Fist Fight (兄弟) 2018 
The Ghetto-Fabulous Lady (福爾摩師奶) 2019 - as  Mr. Potter

Asia Television 1983-1984, 1989 and 2000
 101 Citizen Arrest (101拘捕令) 1983-1984 - as police Inspector
 Storm in Shanghai (上海風雲) 1989
 Divine Retribution (世紀之戰[编辑) 2000

References

1952 births
Male actors from Salt Lake City
Hong Kong male television actors
Hong Kong people of American descent
TVB actors
Living people